Evaristo Endanco was an Italian racing cyclist. He rode in the 1922 Tour de France.

References

Date of death unknown
Italian male cyclists
Place of birth missing